Thornton–Cleveleys (originally simply named Cleveleys) was a railway station in England which served the Lancashire village of Thornton and town of Cleveleys. During its life it was also known at times as Thornton station and Thornton for Cleveleys station. In the 1860s and early 1870s the line was of great importance, being the direct route from London to Glasgow. Before the Shap route was opened, passengers (allegedly including Queen Victoria) would travel from Euston to Fleetwood and then onwards via steamer to Scotland.

The original station was opened in April 1865, and was named Cleveleys. It was to the south of Station Road in Thornton, near an older halt called Ramper Road. The Station Master's house and station building can still be seen in use as a private residence. The station was renamed Thornton for Cleveleys on 1 April 1905. This station closed in 1927 when the new station (the first to be built by the LMS) opened to the north of the level crossing. In February 1953, the station was renamed again, this time to Thornton–Cleveleys. Rationalised in the 1950s and 1960s, and affected by the ending of the ferry from Fleetwood to the Isle of Man, the station eventually closed on 1 June 1970, when the Fleetwood line was closed to passengers. Freight continued on the line to nearby Burn Naze until 1999.

Preservation undertaking 

Today, the majority of the buildings at the station have long since been demolished, but the platforms remain, along with one of the original walls used to support the station's canopy and the bases for the waiting rooms on the up platform.

The site of the main station buildings and bus turning circle are now the site of a supermarket and small shops, narrowing the original down platform by a small amount.

On 1 July 2007, the station was leased by Network Rail to the Poulton & Wyre Railway Society to allow the group of volunteers access to the site to return the station to a restored condition.

Extensive improvements have occurred since the Poulton & Wyre Railway Society have been working on the station, with the site cleared of vegetation and almost all the fences rebuilt in a traditional picket fence style; the society has also resurfaced the down platform.

In April 2013 the society was granted permission to extend their licence and begin work on the next station along the line towards Fleetwood, at Burn Naze. A large hurdle was the section just short of Fleetwood that had been built over by the A585. An alternative route into Fleetwood was not obvious, at least in early 2020.

On 28 February 2020, British Prime Minister Boris Johnson made an unannounced visit to the station during the country's election campaign, and three months before the 50th anniversary of the last passengers arriving there. Johnson invited local councillor Brian Crawford onto the tracks for a private word. When Johnson asked what Crawford needed, he replied that £100,000 was necessary for an initial feasibility study. Johnson granted the request, and said he wanted the station to reopen before the next election, which was due in 2024. The line was one of several chosen as part of a policy to "Reverse Beeching" (see Beeching cuts).

The study, completed in 2021, found that the line could be reopened for heavy rail, to integrate with the national rail network. It confirmed it could also be used for ‘light’ rail, as an extension of the Blackpool Tram route, or as a cross system using vehicles which could operate on both heavy and light rail systems.

The study also found that reopening the link would propose an 11-minute journey from Fleetwood to Poulton, and 28 minutes from Fleetwood to Preston. A journey which currently takes an hour by public transport.

References

External links

 Poulton and Wyre Railway Society, working towards restoring passenger services to Fleetwood
A 1930s view of the station

Disused railway stations in the Borough of Wyre
The Fylde
Former Preston and Wyre Joint Railway stations
Railway stations in Great Britain opened in 1865
Railway stations in Great Britain closed in 1970